Sharifa Mangatong Areef Mohammad Omar Akeel or Sharifa Akeel (born July 24, 1997) is a Filipino-Maguindanaon model and titleholder of Mutya ng Pilipinas 2018 and Miss Asia Pacific International 2018.

Biography
Sharifa Akeel was born in Lebak, Sultan Kudarat. She has a mixed blood of Qatari and Filipino. She plays softball, holds a degree of Bachelor in Elementary Education from the Notre Dame of Salaman College, and presently works as Human Relations Officer at the Congressional office of the Province of Sultan Kudarat.

She ran for governor of Sultan Kudarat in the 2022 elections under Aksyon Demokratiko, but was later defeated by her only opponent, incumbent Datu Abdullah Sangki, Maguindanao mayor Datu Pax Ali Mangudadatu, in the latter's controversial win.

Personal life
On August 25, 2021, Akeel married Esmael Mangudadatu.

Pageantry

Mutya ng Pilipinas 2018
Sharifa was selected as one of the fifty candidates of the Mutya ng Pilipinas 2018. She was crowned as Mutya ng Pilipinas - Asia Pacific International 2018 on Sep 16 at 7:00 p.m. at SM Mall of Asia (MOA) Arena, Pasay and represented the country on Miss Asia Pacific International 2018.

Miss Asia Pacific International 2018
During the 50th celebration of the Miss Asia Pacific International, Sharifa Akeel was crowned as Miss Asia Pacific International 2018 in New Performing Arts Theater, Resorts World Manila on October 4, 2018.  Sharifa was crowned by Brazil's Francielly Ouriques, who won the title last year. She was the fifth Filipina who got the title of Miss Asia Pacific International.

References

Mutya ng Pilipinas winners
Living people
Notre Dame Educational Association alumni
People from Sultan Kudarat
Filipino Muslims
1997 births
Miss Asia Pacific International winners